Breaking Bad is an American television crime drama series created by Vince Gilligan that premiered on AMC on January 20, 2008. Set in Albuquerque, New Mexico, the show follows the life of Walter White (Bryan Cranston), a high school chemistry teacher struggling with stage-three lung cancer who decides to produce and distribute crystal meth with his former student Jesse Pinkman (Aaron Paul) to secure his family's financial future. Concurrently, his wife Skyler (Anna Gunn) grows suspicious and his brother-in-law and DEA agent Hank Schrader (Dean Norris) begins to investigate. After five seasons and a total of 62 episodes, the series concluded on September 29, 2013.

Upon its release, Breaking Bad became one of the highest-rated shows on network television and received universal acclaim, with particular praise for its acting, characters, writing, direction, and cinematography; it entered the Guinness World Records in 2014 as the most critically acclaimed show of all time. Its impact on television resulted in the creation of the spin-off series Better Call Saul, centered on the character of Saul Goodman (Bob Odenkirk), and a sequel released in 2019 as El Camino: A Breaking Bad Movie, both of which also received positive reviews.

The series has been nominated for numerous accolades, winning five American Film Institute awards for Television Program of the Year. For his performance, Cranston was nominated for four consecutive Golden Globes (winning once) and won four Primetime Emmy Awards for Best Lead Actor in a Drama Series. Meanwhile, Paul earned one Golden Globe nomination and won three Emmys for Outstanding Supporting Actor in a Drama Series. Gunn also received several award nominations and won two consecutive Emmys for Outstanding Supporting Actress in a Drama Series.

Also serving as a producer and director, Gilligan was awarded the Writers Guild of America Award for Episodic Drama twice for writing the pilot episode and "Box Cutter". For his portrayal of Gus Fring, Giancarlo Esposito won a Critics' Choice Television Award for Best Supporting Actor in a Drama Series. Robert Forster, who guest-starred as Ed Galbraith, was awarded a Saturn Award for Best Guest Starring Role on Television. Cinematographer Michael Slovis and editors Lynne Willingham and Skip Macdonald were also given award nominations and each earned at least one Emmy nomination for their work on Breaking Bad.

The series has received numerous award nominations from entertainment guilds, including four Directors Guild of America Award nominations, with Gilligan and Rian Johnson both winning one award for Outstanding Directing in a Drama Series; five nominations from the Producers Guild of America Awards (winning two); eleven Screen Actors Guild Award nominations (winning three); and twenty nominations from the Writers Guild of America Awards (winning six). The series also received thirteen Critics' Choice Television Award nominations (winning six), sixteen TCA Award nominations (winning five), twenty-seven Saturn Award nominations (winning twelve), and fifty-eight Emmy nominations (winning sixteen). For its narrative and storytelling execution, Breaking Bad has been named one of the greatest television series of all time.

Awards and nominations

See also
 List of awards and nominations received by Better Call Saul
 List of accolades received by El Camino: A Breaking Bad Movie

Notes

References

External links
 

Awards and nominations
Breaking Bad